This is a list of streets in Omaha, Nebraska. Founded in 1854, today Omaha's population is over 400,000, making it the nation's 40th-largest city in the United States. There are more than 1.2 million residents within a 50-mile (80-km) radius of the city's center, forming the Greater Omaha area. Streets are used primarily for automobile traffic, including public buses. An increasing number of bike lanes are being dedicated on streets throughout the city, as well.

History 
The original 1865 plat of the city contained 22 streets. In 1880 only a quarter mile of Omaha's estimated  of streets were paved. In 1883 Andrew Rosewater, brother of newspaper owner Edward Rosewater, became city engineer and began an ambitious project to modernize city streets. By 1886 the city had  of paved streets, including asphaltum, Colorado sandstone, Sioux Falls granite and wooden blocks.

In 1889 Horace W.S. Cleveland proposed that the city of Omaha develop a series of "broad ornamental avenues, known as boulevards or parkways" designed "with a tasteful arrangement of trees and shrubbery at the sides and in the center", similar to the comprehensive plans of European cities in the mid-19th century. His plan was accepted by the city's Parks Commission, resulting in the construction of Omaha's Prettiest Mile Boulevard in 1892, and dozens of other boulevards in the through to the present. Today, Fontenelle and Lincoln boulevards are among the many remnants of the early plan; Sorensen Parkway is a modern version of the historical plan. Saddle Creek Boulevard, currently known as Saddle Creek Road, which was originally the westernmost boulevard in the system.

List

See also
 History of Omaha

References

External links
 City of Omaha Planning Department. (1992) Omaha's Historic Park and Boulevard System.

Streets
Omaha